Angles-sur-l'Anglin (literally Angles on the Anglin) is a commune in the Vienne department in the Nouvelle-Aquitaine region in western France. It has been selected as one of the most beautiful villages of France.

The Château d'Angles-sur-l'Anglin is a ruined castle dating back to the 11th century, originally constructed for the Bishop of Poitiers.

Geography
The river Anglin flows into the Gartempe in the commune.

See also
 Roc-aux-Sorciers
Communes of the Vienne department

References

Communes of Vienne
Plus Beaux Villages de France